MainActor was video editing software from MainConcept for Windows and since July 15, 2004, also for
Linux. The last version was 5.5, being available for SuSE 10.1 and Ubuntu 6 distributions. In the beginning the software was written on the Amiga.

The software cost EUR€167.23 (US$199.00). A free demo version, that shows a watermark, was available.

MainActor was created and developed by Markus Moenig, the CEO of MainConcept at that time.

In May 2007, MainConcept decided to discontinue the supply and development of MainActor. In November 2007, MainConcept was taken over by DivX, Inc. The software is no longer officially available or supported.

See also 
 Comparison of video editing software
 List of video editing software
 Markus Moenig

External links
 MainConcept home page
 Unofficial MainActor Forums

References 

Video editing software
Windows multimedia software
Linux audio video-related software
Amiga software